Fort Reliance is the site of a Hudson's Bay Company fort located on the east arm of Great Slave Lake, Northwest Territories, Canada.

History 
Fort Reliance was originally built in 1833 by George Back during the Arctic Land Expedition to the Arctic Ocean via the Back River. The expedition, partly scientific and partly searching for the missing John Ross, used Fort Reliance as a winter camp.

Back's fort was made up of a main house with several smaller ones that were constructed from logs. The houses had stone and clay chimneys for heating. The outline of the logs along with the chimneys and some storage pits still exist.

In 1855, the Hudson's Bay Company's Chief Factor James Anderson, for whom the Anderson River is named, rebuilt the fort. It was intended to be used as winter quarters while searching for the lost expedition of John Franklin, but it was again abandoned after one season.

It was not a fur trading outpost although the site was later used by trappers in the Thelon River area. In 1897, a log cabin, using one of the chimneys, was built by an American trapper, Buffalo Jones.

Fort Reliance was designated a National Historic Site in 1953. It is described by Parks Canada as the "oldest continuously operating Hudson's Bay Company post, 1833". Together with the Prince of Wales Northern Heritage Centre, Parks Canada is working to preserve and protect the site, which has resulted in the chimneys being rehabilitated. In 2010, the same property was designated “Old Fort Reliance Territorial Historic Site."

The site lies within Thaidene Nene National Park Reserve. If that proposed national park is ever realized, Fort Reliance National Historic Site would also join the national park system as a separate unit.

Climate

Demographics 

References

External links
Narrative of the Arctic land expedition to the mouth of the Great Fish River, and along the shores of the Arctic Ocean in the years 1833, 1834, and 1835, complete text of the book by George Back at the Internet Archive.

Forts in the Northwest Territories
Heritage sites in the Northwest Territories
Hudson's Bay Company forts
Buildings and structures in the Northwest Territories
Ghost towns in the Northwest Territories
National Historic Sites in the Northwest Territories
1833 establishments in Canada